The University of the Philippines Rural High School was established as a subsidiary of the Department of Agricultural Education (DAE, now Department of Agricultural Education and Rural Studies or DAERS) of the University of the Philippines College of Agriculture, pursuant to Sec.4 of Act 3377 of the Philippine Legislature which was approved on December 3, 1927. The school, with a vocational curriculum, served as a practice school for the training of teachers, provided secondary education in agriculture for those preparing for college, and trained intermediate school graduates in agriculture.

Subsequently, it has evolved into its current status as a full, state university high school with a science-oriented curriculum aligned with that of UP Los Baños. It also has continued to serve as a teaching laboratory for UPLB students whose degree programs allow teaching options.

History
Classes in the UPRHS were first held in the present rooms of the Department of Agricultural Economics. A concrete one-story building with a multi-purpose hall, two classrooms, a kitchen and a sewing room was constructed in 1931. At present the building now houses the Southern Tagalog Agricultural Resources, Research and Development Consortium Office.

With the institution of Home Economics in 1939, the school had two curricula—the Boys' and the Girls' Curricula—which were basically the same except that the latter had home economics.

During the Japanese regime, the school continued functioning with the major curricular changes in the replacement of English and U.S. History with Japanese, Filipino, Language, Reading, and Character Education.

Until the latter part of the 1950s, the UP Rural High School served as a practice school for majors in Agricultural Education. With the abolition of the certificate program for Junior-Agriculture teachers, the adoption of the eight-week off-campus practice teaching, and the diminution of the twenty-hours-a-week field work, the school gradually gave up its original function.

In 1960, the vocational curriculum was changed to College Preparatory by adding more academic courses (English, Mathematics, Science, History) and shortening the periods in Agriculture and Home Economics to only four hours and twenty minutes a week. The Boys and Girls Curricula were combined into one in 1969.

In December 1970, the UPRHS moved to the newly renovated Women's Dorm located in front of the St. Therese of Child Jesus Parish. The building provided a bigger library, chemistry laboratory, a kitchen, a sewing room, eight classrooms and faculty offices.

The School has implemented the 1960 curriculum up to 1999 with the replacement of the traditional history courses with Social Studies I (The Community), Social Studies II (The Nation), Social Studies III (Economic Development & Program), and Social Studies IV (The World: A Cultural Perspective), as well as the inclusion of the Youth Development Program (YDT) which covers Scouting, Physical Education, Music, and Citizen Army Training (later replaced by the Preparatory Military Training or PMT) as required by the Department of Education and Culture in 1972.

Since 1998, students, as prescribed by the present Department of Education, Culture & Sports, are now taking up Economics in their fourth year. World History, on the other hand, is now being offered to the juniors.

In 1979, Agriculture and Home Economics periods were further reduced to four hours a week. A change in the Mathematics curriculum was also implemented with the replacement of the traditional Mathematics courses with Math I (Modern Math), Math II (First Course in Algebra), Math III (Geometry), Math IV-A (Second Course in Algebra, part I), Math IV-B (Second Course in Algebra, part II), Math V (Introduction to Trigonometry), Math VI (Advanced Algebra), and Math VII (Introduction to Statistics). Advanced Mathematics classes have been offered starting school year 1980–81 to students who rate high in the math test of the entrance exam and later qualify in a test given to them.

In the school year 1999–2000, the Mathematics department proposed an amendment to the Math curriculum of UPRHS. To be implemented starting school year 2000-2001 are the courses Math 3-A (Advanced Algebra, formerly Math IV-A and IV-B) and Math 3-B (Geometry, formerly Math III). On the other hand, 4th year Math courses such as Math 4-A (Trigonometry with Introductory Calculus, formerly Math V & VI) and Math 4-B (Introduction to Statistics, formerly Math VII) will be offered starting school year 2001–2002.

The Science Curriculum has also been revised with a corresponding increase in number of credit units and number of class hours per week from three hours and thirty minutes per week with one unit credit to six hours per week with two units credit.

On June 21, 1999, UPRHS moved to its new home at Brgy. Paciano Rizal, Bay, Laguna. Since 2005, the school has been under the jurisdiction of the UPLB College of Arts and Sciences and is still recognized "as a state university high school of high academic achievement and of strong commitment to its continuing task in molding the youth".

On May 1, 2003, with the institution of the Bachelor of Science in Mathematics and Science Teaching Program, the administration of UP Rural High School was turned over to the College of Arts and Sciences (CAS), UPLB. Under the headship of CAS, UPRHS has strengthened its place in the university as BS MST students majoring in biology, Chemistry, Physics, and Mathematics undertake their field studies and teaching internship at UPRHS under the monitoring of the UPRHS faculty.

In 2013, UPRHS took the challenge of improving its curriculum in preparation for the implementation of the Enhanced Basic Education Program, otherwise known as the K-12 program.

UPRHS started the implementation of the Senior High School program in 2016. The said SHS program offers two strands of academic track curriculum: STEAM (Science, Technology, Engineering, Agriculture and Mathematics), and GAS (General Academics) with sub-strands on Business Studies and 
Humanities / Social Science. The school calendar shift was also approved by the Board of Regents the same year, thus making the school year open in August and end in May of the following year.

Academics and Admissions

Admissions process
The UP Rural High School (UPRHS) Entrance Examination is a 3-hour and 20-
minute competitive examination on the following areas: Language Proficiency, Reading
Comprehension, Mathematics and Science.

Examinees who rank among the top 125 in the UP Rural High School Entrance
Examination are the Qualifiers for admission. In the event that some of them choose not to
enroll, the slots they will vacate will be given to those in the Waiting List in the order of their
ranking until all the 125 slots are filled up.

Curriculum
Students undergo through a College Preparatory Curriculum with strong emphasis in the sciences and mathematics. This ensures that the students are all ready to take all the challenges when they graduate and enter the premier universities and colleges in and even outside the country.

Sections
Starting SY 1999–2000, UPRHS has around 41 or 42 students in each class, with 3 classes per batch, in a total of about 125 students in each year level. The names of the sections are trees.
First : Dao, Ipil, and Tindalo
Second : Dungon, Kamagong, and Katmon
Third : Acacia, Mahogany, and Molave
Fourth : Guijo, Narra, and Yakal

Prior to the transfer to the present site in Brgy Paciano Rizal Bay, Laguna in 1999, UPRHS has 4 sections each for a total of 160 students per year level. The following are the defunct sections of UPRHS.
 First : Lauan
 Second : Mancono
 Third : Apitong
 Fourth : Kalantas

Notable alumni

Emerlinda R. Roman, Ph.D. (Class 1966) - First female UP President*
Clare R. Baltazar, Ph.D. (Class 1943) - National Scientist and Professor Emeritus of Entomology, UPLB*
Antonio Mabesa (Class 1952) - Movie, television and theater actor; Professor Emeritus of CAL, UP Diliman*
Capt. Proceso L. Maligalig (Class 1962) - Former President, Bataan Shipyard and Engineering Company (BASECO); President Emeritus and co-founder, Reform the Armed Forces Movement*
Lizbeth S. de Padua, M.D. (Class 1972) - A Neurologist and medical director at St. Luke's Epilepsy Center, St. Luke's University Hospital, Bethlehem, Pennsylvania ; Bb. Pilipinas-Universe 1976; Summa Cum Laude, BS Biology, University of the Philippines Los Baños; Cum Laude, University of the Philippines Manila, Medicine.*
Vincent Ferdinand "Ebe" Dancel  (Class 1993) - Lead vocalist, Sugarfree*
Bonifacio Ilagan  (Class 1968) - Multi-awarded writer and director*
Maj. Gen. Leopoldo L. Maligalig  (Class 1970) - Former Superintendent, Philippine Military Academy; Los Baños, Laguna Outstanding Resident of 2008; Consultant, Lopez Holdings Corporation*
Felino Lansigan, Ph.D.  (Class 1970) - Professor, Institute of Statistics, University of the Philippines at Los Baños. He is also a recipient of NAST Hugh Greenwood Environmental Science Award and a contributor to the Intergovernmental Panel on Climate Change (IPCC).*
Jonas Baes, Ph.D.(Class 1977) - UP Diliman College of Music Professor*
PBrig. Gen. Danilo L. Maligalig (Class 1978) - Former deputy director for Administration, CIDG - Philippine National Police; Former Director, Cavite Police Provincial Office*
Maj. Gen. Elmer Pabale (Class 1978) - Former Commander, Army Support Command, Philippine Army*
Rear Adm. Rafael Mariano (Class 1978) - Former Vice Commander, Philippine Navy*
Gen. Benjamin Madrigal Jr. (Class 1980) - Former Chief of Staff, Armed Forces of the Philippines; Administrator, Philippine Coconut Authority*
Lemuel Cuento (Class 1988) - tenor. Lemuel studied at the Hong Kong Academy of Music and earned his diploma in Opera Performance at the Vienna Conservatory. His voice teacher was Sylvia Greenberg. He has since performed Tamino in The Magic Flute, Hans in The Bartered Bride (Smetana), The Duke in Rigoletto, Alfredo in La Traviata, Ubaldo in Armida (Haydn) and Fenton in The Merry Wives of Windsor. In 2004, he was engaged at the theater in Pforzheim, where he essayed various roles like Don Carlo, Florestan in Fidelio, Rodolfo in La Bohème, Cavaradossi in Tosca, Jim Mahoney in Mahagonny, Lensky in Eugene Onegin, Canio in I Pagliacci, Luigi in Il Tabarro, The Steersman in The Flying Dutchman as well as in classical operettas like Paganini, The Duke in A Night in Venice and Edwin in Czardasfürstin. Other roles he has done include Aliatar in a rarely done opera called Pelagio by Saverio Mercandante (performed in Guijon, Spain) and Hoffmann.*
Jerrold Tarog (Class 1994) - multi-awarded film director, composer, writer, editor, and sound designer responsible for critically acclaimed feature films such as "Confessional", "Mangatyanan", "Senior Year" and the "Punerarya" segment of 2010's Shake, Rattle and Roll 12. His short film "Faculty" was featured on ANC's AmBisyon 2010, which showcased twenty of the brightest creative minds in today's Philippine cinema.*
Ramon Lorenzo Luis R. Guinto, MD (Class 2005) - Member of the Youth Commission, Lancet-University of Oslo Commission on Global Governance for Health (in cooperation with Harvard Global Health Institute); Liaison Officer to the World Health Organization (2012-2013), Regional Coordinator for the Asia-Pacific (2011-2012), and Founding Coordinator of the Global Health Equity Initiative (2011-2012), International Federation of Medical Students' Association*
 Ricardo M. Lantican, Ph.D.(Class 1950) - National Scientist of Plant breeding and Genetics; Former Undersecretary for R&D of DOST*
Napoleon M. Apolinario, M.D. (Class 1954) - former chairman and medical director of Philippine General Hospital*
Lily M. Rosqueta-Rosales, Ed.D., RGC (Class 1948) - former Dean and retired Professor of College of Education, UP Diliman*
Niko C. Cedicol, M.D.  (Class 2006) - Painter; Participant of various art exhibitions like Amorsolo's Makiling (2009), Opus Elbi, and Labing-Isang Daliri; Physician; Graduate of UP Manila College of Medicine; volunteer to DOH's Doctor to the Barrios program; brother of Sayid Cedicol.*
Sayid C. Cedicol, M.D., M.P.M. (Class 1998) - Painter; Also a participant of various art exhibitions; Military physician; Emergency Medicine specialist, trained at Philippine General Hospital; Graduated magna cum laude, BS Biology, Class 2002-UPLB*
Dr. Cynthia C. Romero-Mamon, Ph.D.  (Class 1969) - CEO and managing director of Sun Microsystems Philippines (the only woman CEO of a major multinational IT company in the country today); Chief Operating Officer and vice-president for Sales Marketing Imagineering Leisure & Entertainment (SMILE) Division of Enchanted Kingdom, Inc*
 Merle Mendoza-Balicao (Class 1970) - Proprietress of MerNel's Cake House, Home of the famous chocolate cake in Los Baños, Laguna*
Rosanna C. Ladaga-Llenado (Class 1986) - brains and force behind one of the country's most successful review and learning centers, AHEAD Tutorial and Review Center*
Cedric Castillo (Class 2000) - News reporter, GMA Network
2LT Jose Delfin Khe (Class 2001) - PMA graduate killed in action during an MILF encounter in Basilan on October 18, 2011
Rogel Mari Sese, Ph.D. (Class 1996) - Focal Person for the Philippine Space Science Education Program; Philippine's representative to the Asia-Pacific Regional Space Agency Forum (APRSAF) and other international conferences on space science education.(Class 2000) - News reporter, GMA Network

*Featured in the 80th founding anniversary (UPRHS Mighty @ 80!):

References

"Our Story", The Ruralite Volume XLIV No. 2-3, July–August 2000
"Paragon",, the UP Rural High School Class of 2001 website
"Ruralites reap science awards", UPLB Horizon, March 2006
"Biographies Section", Invictus, UPRHS Class of 2002 yearbook
"UPRHS Journalism Club" SY:06-10
"Ilao, S.A.L. Our Story: A Peek at RHS History." The Ruralite July 2000 & August–September 2000
"A Path to Gold". UPRHS Class 1982.
"IMSP Professor designated as focal person in Philippine Space Science Education Program", 

High schools in Laguna (province)
Educational institutions established in 1927
1927 establishments in the Philippines